Ilamelmis foveicollis, is a species of riffle beetle found in Sri Lanka.

Description
It is inhabited on stone in the cascade zone, stones on the shore, and on stones in the current.

References 

Elmidae
Insects of Sri Lanka
Insects described in 1896